Paroa: Ang Kwento ni Mariposa (International title: The Story of Mariposa / ) is a Philippine television drama fantasy series broadcast by GMA Network. Directed by Mark A. Reyes, it stars Barbie Forteza in the title role. It premiered on November 5, 2012 on the network's Telebabad line up replacing Moon Embracing the Sun. The series concluded on March 1, 2013 with a total of 85 episodes. It was replaced by Forever in its timeslot.

Premise
Mariposa, a girl who belongs to the kingdom of the butterfly people known as Paroa. However, she will grow up in the human world because their kingdom got destroyed. Her mother Aurora, the queen of Paroa, will save her from the destruction of their kingdom. Thus, Mariposa will grow up under the care of Amalia who treats her as her own child despite her strange looks — Mariposa's skin is similar to a woolly worm. Despite people making fun of her looks, Mariposa will still have a cheerful and optimistic disposition.

Meanwhile, Iñigo will grow up hating the Paroas because her mother Rosanna told him that his father died because of them. He will be Mariposa's high school classmate. He has a bad-boy image and always gets kicked out from school that's why he is still in his sophomore year. Iñigo and Mariposa will be friends but because of peer pressure he will also mock and make fun of Mariposa. However, when Mariposa transforms into a beautiful Paroa, Iñigo will like and develop feelings towards her not knowing that she is the same girl who he mocked and at the same time a Paroa who he grew up hating.

Cast and characters

Lead cast
 Barbie Forteza as Mariposa de Guzman / Aira

Supporting cast
 Derrick Monasterio as Iñigo Villamor 
 Joyce Ching as Rebecca "Becca" Sarmiento 
 Ruru Madrid as Rasul 
 Miguel Tanfelix as Joko Santos
 Tanya Garcia as Aurora
 Agot Isidro as Amalia de Guzman 
 Alicia Mayer as Rosanna Villamor
 Maritoni Fernandez as Belen Sarmiento
 Lexi Fernandez as Giselle Sarmiento
 Lani Mercado as Dahlia 
 Gerard Pizarras as Adon

Recurring cast
 Marc Acueza as Desmond
 Bianca Umali as Leah
 Shyr Valdez as Lani Santos
 German Moreno as Apo Pasko
 Jhoana Marie Tan as Lila
 Shermaine Santiago as Talisay
 Gino dela Peña as Roman
 Rita Daniela as Lizzy
 Rhen Escaño as Betty
 Janna Trites as Tess
 Robert Villar as Uno
 Isabel "Lenlen" Frial as Pao-pao
 Neil Ryan Sese as Armando Villamor

Guest cast
 Kryshee Grengia as young Mariposa
 Ashley Cabrera as young Becca
 Byron Ortile as young Joko

Ratings
According to AGB Nielsen Philippines' Mega Manila household television ratings, the pilot episode of Paroa: Ang Kuwento ni Mariposa earned a 12.1% rating. While the final episode scored a 12.1% rating.

References

External links
 

2012 Philippine television series debuts
2013 Philippine television series endings
Fantaserye and telefantasya
Filipino-language television shows
GMA Network drama series
Television shows set in Manila